Rainbow Springs State Park is a Florida state park located  on U.S. 41, 3 miles (5 km) north of Dunnellon, Florida. The looking-glass waters of Rainbow Springs come from several vents, not one large bubbling spring. The river itself supports a wide variety of fish, wildlife, and plants, many within easy viewing by visitors. In total, the park contains 11 distinct natural communities, including sandhills, flatwoods, upland mixed forests, and hydric hammocks.

Visitors are able to see a variety of wildflowers in season; oak, longleaf pines, magnolia, dogwood, red maple, redbud, cypress, sabal, and hickory trees; gray squirrels, red-shouldered hawks, swallowtail kites, barred owls, whitetail deer, and a wide variety of wading birds. The relative peace and quiet of the winter season offers much for the nature enthusiast. An interpretive room located in the visitor center displays the historical, natural, and cultural resources of the park.

History

Geography
The Rainbow River flows from Rainbow Springs into the Withlacoochee River.

Ecology
Among the wildlife of the park are gray squirrels, otter, turtles, alligators, and many types of birds. Among the birds are songbirds, hummingbirds, red-shoulder hawks, and swallowtail kites, as well as ospreys, barred owls, and various water birds. The site has a  nature trail.

Recreational activities and amenities
Activities include swimming, snorkeling, canoeing, kayaking, and wildlife viewing. Amenities include a nature trail, a full-service campground, a picnic area with pavilions, canoe and kayak rentals, and gardens, as well as access to the Rainbow River. It also  has waterfalls and phosphate pits from former open-mining activity. A small zoo complex was once located in the gardens. Some of the facilities still exist, but are no longer used. At the entrance is a small visitor center, shop, snack bar, and restrooms, located in an elevated position above Rainbow Springs with a good view along the Rainbow River.

Hours
Florida state parks are open between 8:00 am and sundown every day of the year (including holidays).

References

External links

 Rainbow Springs State Park at Florida State Parks
 Rainbow Springs State Park at Absolutely Florida
 Rainbow Springs State Park at Wildernet

State parks of Florida
Former zoos
National Natural Landmarks in Florida
Parks in Marion County, Florida